Troy Waste Manufacturing Company Building, also known as the McCarthy Building, is a historic textile factory located at Troy, Rensselaer County, New York. It was built about 1908, and is a five-story, triangular shaped brick building with a flat roof and high basement.  It features a tall square stair tower, formal entranceway, and Classical Revival style terra cotta ornamentation.

It was listed on the National Register of Historic Places in 2014.

References

Industrial buildings and structures on the National Register of Historic Places in New York (state)
Neoclassical architecture in New York (state)
Industrial buildings completed in 1908
Buildings and structures in Rensselaer County, New York
National Register of Historic Places in Troy, New York
1908 establishments in New York (state)
Textile mills in New York (state)